My Blood Runs Cold is a 1965 American neo noir dark thriller film starring Troy Donahue, Joey Heatherton and Barry Sullivan. It was directed by William Conrad. It was the second of three thrillers Conrad made for Warner Bros. A young woman falls in love with a man who may be insane.

Plot
After a car accident, Julie meets a stranger who tells her he is in love with her. The young man, Ben Gunther, believes he and the young woman, Julie Merriday, are the reincarnations of lovers from an earlier time. Ben calls Julie 'Barbara' and gives her a gold locket with her picture in it. Ben takes her sailing and they swim to a cave where he tells her he found the locket. Aunt Sarah confirms Ben's stories that match the family history. Julie's controlling father and boyfriend distrust Ben. He convinces Julie of his beliefs and encourages her to run off with him to marry.  Julie's need for independence leads her to say yes to Ben.

On a stormy night the couple sail away to elope. The father calls the Sheriff who discovers Ben's real name is Arthur Maine, an escaped murderer from an insane asylum. The police search for the sailboat by helicopter. Julie finds a diary of Benjamin H. Gunther dated 1874 on the boat that exposes Ben's fraud. Julie is scared but he still professes his love.

To escape the police, the couple land the boat but are seen running on a beach. There is an extended chase and boyfriend Harry tries to reason with 'Ben'. Julie escapes but the two men climb a high sand plant platform and in the struggle Ben falls to his death.

Cast
 Troy Donahue as Ben Gunther
 Joey Heatherton as Julie Merriday
 Barry Sullivan as Julian Merriday
 Nicolas Coster as Harry Lindsay
 Jeanette Nolan as Aunt Sarah
 Russell Thorson as Sheriff
 Ben Wright as Lansbury
 Shirley Mitchell as Mrs. Courtland
 Howard McNear as Henry
 Howard Wendell as Mayor
 John Holland as Mr. Courtland
 John McCook as Owen

Production
The movie was a considerable change of pace for Donahue. It was shot on the Monterey Peninsula in late 1964.

Reception

Box office
The film was profitable.

Critical
The Washington Post called the film "woolly" and full of plotholes. The New York Times called it a "wordy, bloodless little Warner chiller." "A blah Troy Donahue and a bad script spoil the show" said the Los Angeles Times.

See also
List of American films of 1965

References

External links
 
 
 My Blood Runs Cold at Letterbox DVD
 My Blood Runs Cold at BFI
 Review of film at New York Times
 Review of film at Cinema Retro

1965 films
1960s psychological thriller films
American black-and-white films
American psychological thriller films
Films scored by George Duning
Films directed by William Conrad
Films set in California
Warner Bros. films
1960s English-language films
1960s American films